Michael Griffin (born April 1887) was an English footballer who played as a striker.

External links
 LFC History profile

1887 births
English footballers
Liverpool F.C. players
Year of death missing
Association football forwards